Kasama Airport  is an airport serving Kasama, Northern Province, Zambia.

The Kasama non-directional beacon (ident: KS) is located at the eastern edge of the field.

Airlines and destinations

See also
List of airports in Zambia
Transport in Zambia

References

 Google Earth
 CloudMade maps

External links
 OpenStreetMap - Kasama
 FallingRain - Kasama Airport
 

Airports in Zambia
Buildings and structures in Northern Province, Zambia
Buildings and structures in Kasama, Zambia